The Taoyaomen Bridge (Traditional Chinese: 桃夭門大橋, Simplified Chinese: 桃夭门大桥, Pinyin: táo yāo mén dà qiáo), is a cable-stayed bridge located in Zhoushan, Zhejiang Province of the PRC, that crosses the Taoyaomen Channel (Simplified Chinese: 桃夭门水道), linking Fuchi Island (Simplified Chinese: 富翅岛) and Cezi Island (Simplified Chinese: 册子岛). It is the third bridge of the Zhoushan Islands-Linking megaproject (see: Zhoushan Trans-oceanic Bridges).

Its seven spans are of 48m + 48m + 50m + 580m (main span) + 50m + 48m + 48m.

See also
 Zhoushan
 G9211 Ningbo–Zhoushan Expressway

References

Yangtze River Delta
Cable-stayed bridges in China
Bridges completed in 2003
Bridges in Zhoushan
Cross-sea bridges in China